The Nakoaiyet Islands are an uninhabited island group located northeast of Qikirtajuaq Island in Ungava Bay, in Qikiqtaaluk Region within the Canadian territory of Nunavut.

References

External links 
 Nakoaiyet Islands in the Atlas of Canada - Toporama; Natural Resources Canada

Uninhabited islands of Qikiqtaaluk Region